Ptitsyn may refer to:

 Alyosha Ptitsyn Grows Up, 1953 Soviet film
 Mikhail Ptitsyn, currently Chairman of the Moscow City Court
 Roman Ptitsyn, Russian politician